On February 28, 1999, the body of Minerliz "Minnie" Soriano was found bound and wrapped inside a garbage bag, dumped inside a garbage dumpster behind a video store in Co-op City section of the Bronx, New York City. She had been strangled and sexually abused, and missing for three days after leaving her middle school. Her case went unsolved for twenty-two years, until Police used advance DNA technology to help them arrest a suspect in November 2021.

It is the first time in New York City that a case was solved using familial DNA.

Investigation 
The key piece of evidence in the case was a semen stain found on Soriano's sweatshirt which was preserved since 1999. In 2019, the sample was run through the New York State convicted offender DNA database (CODIS) and linked the DNA to the suspect's deceased father. Investigators later obtained a sample of Martinez's DNA and matched the sample to him.

Accused 
After using advanced DNA technology, Joseph Martinez, who goes by "Jupiter Joe" and taught children astronomy was arrested and accused of strangling Soriano between February 24–28, 1999 while sexually assaulting her. He had been connected to the case using a familial DNA link, as his deceased father's DNA was matched to a DNA sample that had been collected from semen on Soriano's sweatshirt. He was arrested on two counts of second-degree murder.

At the time of his arrest, Martinez lived in New Rochelle and previously taught children about astronomy, by setting up a powerful telescope on busy sidewalks, and offering views and lessons to those that wanted. Due to his highly public profile many have taken to social media to discuss their shock and disbelief that Martinez could commit such a crime.

References

External links 
 Minerliz Soriano on Find A Grave

1999 murders in the United States
Deaths by person in New York City
February 1999 events in the United States
1999 in New York City
February 1999 crimes